Panniyannur is a census town in Thalassery taluk of Kannur district in the Indian state of Kerala. It is part of Greater Mahé Region.

Proposed New Mahe Municipality 
The proposed New Mahe Municipality comprises:
Azhiyur panchayat, Vatakara taluk, Kozhikode district, Kerala
New Mahe panchayat, Thalassery taluk, Kannur district, Kerala
Chokli panchayat, Thalassery taluk, Kannur district, Kerala
Panniyannur panchayat, Thalassery taluk, Kannur district, Kerala

Demographics
As of 2011 Census, Panniyannur had a population of 22,308. Males constitute 45% of the population and females 55%. Average sex ratio was 1120 higher than state average of 1084. Panniyannur had average literacy rate of 97.3%, higher than the state average of 94%: male literacy was 98.2%, and female literacy was 96.7%. In Panniyannur, 10.8% of the population was under 6 years of age.

Location
Panniyannur is located 8 km from the town of Tellichery or Thalassery. The same is surrounded by the places like Chokli, Mahedistrict, Kadirur, Mokery, Panoor. personalities like Moyarath Shankaran, Thayatt Shankaran and M. V. Devan are from this village.

Transportation
The national highway(NH66) passes through Thalassery town, NewMahe and Mahe(puduchery).Goa and Mumbai can be accessed on the northern side and Cochin and Thiruvananthapuram can be accessed on the southern side.  The road to the east of Iritty connects to Mysore and Bangalore. The nearest railway station is Thalassery on Mangalore-Palakkad line. 
Trains are available to almost all parts of India subject to advance booking over the internet.  There are airports at Kannur and Calicut. Both of them are international airports but direct flights are available only to Middle Eastern countries.

References

Villages near Thalassery
Cities and towns in Kannur district